The gelechioid moth genus Stenoptera, established by Duponchel in 1838, is a junior synonym of Esperia. The gall midge genus Stenoptera, invalidly established by Meunier in 1902, has been renamed Neostenoptera.

Stenoptera is a genus of flowering plants from the family Orchidaceae, endemic to South America.

Species 
Species accepted as of June 2014:

 Stenoptera acuta Lindl. - Peru, Brazil
 Stenoptera ciliaris C.Schweinf. - Peru
 Stenoptera ecuadorana Dodson & C.Vargas - Ecuador
 Stenoptera huilaensis Garay - Colombia
 Stenoptera laxiflora C.Schweinf. - Peru
 Stenoptera montana C.Schweinf. - Peru
 Stenoptera peruviana C.Presl - Colombia, Ecuador, Peru

References

External links 
 
 

Cranichidinae
Cranichideae genera
Orchids of South America
Taxa named by Carl Borivoj Presl